Sweden entered the Eurovision Song Contest 1993, held in Millstreet, Ireland.

At Eurovision, Sweden performed 13th, following France and preceding Ireland. As the close of the voting, they had finished 7th in a field of 25 with 89 points.

Before Eurovision

Melodifestivalen 1993 
Melodifestivalen 1993 was the selection for the 33rd song to represent Sweden at the Eurovision Song Contest. It was the 32nd time that this system of picking a song had been used. 1569 songs were submitted to SVT for the competition. The final was held in the Lisebergshallen in Gothenburg on 5 March 1993, presented by Triple & Touch and was broadcast on TV2 and Sveriges Radio's P4 network. The show was watched by 4,284,000 people, with a total of 166,045 votes cast.

The winner was selected over two rounds of voting. After the juries had selected 5 songs for a "super final", it was revealed that the TV viewers would choose the winner by regional televoting. However, the voting became a bit repetitive, and televoting was not re-introduced until six years later when it was combined with regional juries.

The winner was the dansband Arvingarna with the song "Eloise".

At Eurovision
Arvingarna performed thirteenth at the 1993 Eurovision Song Contest, following France's Patrick Fiori with "Mama Corsica" and preceding Ireland's Niamh Kavanagh with "In Your Eyes." Their performance was jaunty and colorful, with the boys standing on stage in blue suits. The conductor was Curt-Eric Holmquist. While perhaps not particularly modern, it was still very catchy, and the juries awarded it 7th place with 89 points, thereby ensuring that Sweden had qualified for the following year's contest under the newly-introduced relegation system. The Swedish jury awarded their twelve points to eventual contest-winners Ireland.

Voting

References

External links
TV broadcastings at SVT's open archive

1993
Countries in the Eurovision Song Contest 1993
1993
Eurovision
Eurovision